Cerithium dialeucum is a species of sea snail, a marine gastropod mollusk in the family Cerithiidae.

Description

Distribution
The distribution of Cerithium dialeucum includes the Western Central Pacific.
 Philippines
 Guam

References

Cerithiidae
Gastropods described in 1849